2018 Florida shooting may refer to:

 Jacksonville Landing shooting
 Stoneman Douglas High School shooting